Mogens René Holm Hansen (born 12 April 1956) is a Danish former footballer who played as a forward. He made five appearances for the Denmark national team from 1976 to 1984.

References

External links
 

1956 births
Living people
Danish men's footballers
Association football forwards
Denmark international footballers
2. Bundesliga players
Næstved Boldklub players
SpVgg Bayreuth players
Danish expatriate men's footballers
Danish expatriate sportspeople in Germany
Expatriate footballers in Germany